Kenneth Wayne Bragg (born August 7, 1950) is an American politician in Arkansas. He has served since January 2013 as a Republican member of the Arkansas House of Representatives for District 15 in Grant County, a traditional Democratic stronghold. In 2015, his colleagues named him the House Majority Leader, a position he held for two years.

Bragg is a former member of the city council in Sheridan. He is Southern Baptist.

Bragg is the son of the former Eula Mae Harrington (1918–1970) and Lawrence C. Bragg (also 1918–1970), a sergeant in World War II; the couple lived in Port Arthur, Texas, and are interred at Greenlawn Memorial Park in Groves, Texas. In 1972, Bragg received a Bachelor of Science degree in forestry from Stephen F. Austin State University in Nacogdoches, Texas. Since that time he has been employed in the forestry industry, including a 25-year commitment to International Paper Company. He is a member of the executive committee of the Arkansas Forestry Association.

In 2013, the Arkansas Timber Producers Association named Bragg "Legislator of the Year" for his sponsorship of legislation to eliminate the sales tax on forestry equipment, a move which the association contends will make the timber industry more competitive with its counterparts in surrounding states.  His Facebook page shows his political views as conservative.

Bragg and his wife, Beverly J. Bragg (born 1951), originally from Port Arthur, Texas, have a son, Aaron Christopher Bragg (born 1977), a Certified Public Accountant in Little Rock, who in 2013 wed the assistant U.S. attorney Allison Courtney Waldrip. The Braggs also have a daughter.

References

1950 births
Living people
Republican Party members of the Arkansas House of Representatives
Arkansas city council members
Baptists from Texas
People from Sheridan, Arkansas
People from Port Arthur, Texas
Stephen F. Austin State University alumni
American foresters
21st-century American politicians
Baptists from Arkansas